The Special Jury Prize is an official award given at the Venice Film Festival to one of the feature films in competition slate since 2013. It is considered the third most prestigious prize at the festival, the runner-up to both the main award Golden Lion and the second place award Grand Jury Prize.

Winners

See also 
 Golden Lion
 Grand Jury Prize

References

External links
 The Venice Film Festival at the IMDb
 La Bienalle, official awards of the 74th Venice Film Festival

Venice Film Festival
 
Italian film awards
Lists of films by award